A hard landing occurs when an aircraft or spacecraft hits the ground with a greater vertical speed and force than in a normal landing.

Landing is the final phase in flight, in which  the aircraft returns to the ground. Crew judgment is most reliable to determine hard landing, as determination based on recorded acceleration value is difficult and not advisable, partially because there is no recording of true vertical acceleration.

Hard landings can be caused by weather conditions, mechanical problems, overweight aircraft, pilot decision and/or pilot error. The term hard landing usually implies that the pilot still has total or partial control over the aircraft, as opposed to an uncontrolled descent into terrain (a crash).

Hard landings can vary in their consequences, from mild passenger discomfort to vehicle damage, structural failure, injuries, and/or loss of life. When an aircraft has a hard landing, it must be inspected for damage before its next flight.

Hard landings can cause extensive damage to aircraft if not carried out safely or properly. For example, on 20 June 2012, a Boeing 767 of All Nippon Airways landed with such force that a large crease formed in the aircraft's skin.

When the final approach isn't stabilised, the crew is to abort and go around; this was the recommendation of the Australian Transport Safety Bureau after investigating the hard landing of a Malaysia Airlines Airbus A330 at Melbourne Airport after arriving from Kuala Lumpur on 14 March 2015.

The Irish low-cost airline Ryanair has acquired a reputation for hard landings. A blog pointed out that the reason why hard landings occur in Ryanair flights is not because the pilots aren't properly trained (The Ryanair pilots are actually properly trained as professionals) but rather because hard landings provide Ryanair pilots the ability to land safely and firmly in any kind of conditions, and in a quick manner, saving money for Ryanair and thus contributes to Ryanair's low-priced fares. 

For helicopters, a hard landing can occur after mechanical or engine damage or failure when the rotor(s) are still intact and free to turn. Autorotation, in which airflow over the rotors keeps them turning and provides some lift, can allow limited pilot control during descent. As an unpowered descent, it requires considerable pilot skill and experience to safely execute.

A hard landing of a spacecraft such as a rocket stage usually ends with its destruction and can be intentional or unintentional.  When a high-velocity impact is planned (when its purpose is to study consequences of impact), the spacecraft is called an impactor.

See also
 Deadstick landing
 Emergency landing
 Forced landing
 Soft landing (rocketry)

References

External links 
 Stabilized Approach and Flare Are Keys to Avoiding Hard Landings / Flight Safety Foundation, FSF Digest, August 2004

Aviation risks
Types of landing